Vinod Raina (died 12 September 2013) was an Indian educationist.  He was a member of drafting of the Right to Education Act.

Career
Vinod Raina resigned from his job at Delhi University to work on education reforms in India. He was one of the co-founders of the Bharat Gyan Vigyan Samiti(BGVS) and All-India People’s Science Network (AIPSN).

He was a Homi Bhabha Fellow, a fellow of the Nehru Memorial Museum and Library, New Delhi, Asia Leadership Fellow, Japan, and an Honorary Fellow of the Indian Science Writers Association. Dr. Raina worked with the Bhopal Gas Disaster victims and the anti-Narmada dam campaign.

He helped conceptualize the Victims of Development project and co-edited the subsequent volume ‘The Dispossessed’.

Dr. Raina was also a member of the International Council of the World Social Forum.

Death
He died of cancer on 12 September 2013.

Very few people know he was suffering from cancer for the last few years of his life. During this period, he actively continued his work, and poured energies into the implementation of the  Right to Education Act, as well as the various people's groups and policy committees that he was a part of.

Awards and honours
 Fellow - Homi Bhabha
 Fellow - Nehru Memorial Museum and Library, New Delhi
 Honorary Fellow - Indian Science Writers Association.
 Asia Leadership Fellow (Japan) in 2002.

Writings /Publications
 Where do children go after class VIII?
 The national curriculum framework
 Twenty years of relentless struggle - Bhopal Gas Disaster
 Killing the bill
Books
 Making Sense of Community Participation, Community Participation and Empowerment in Primary Education

See also
Right of Children to Free and Compulsory Education Act
World social forum
Narmada Bachao Andolan
Bhopal disaster

References

External links
 Profile on ARENA
 Fifth International Conference to review research on Science, TEchnology and Mathematics Education participant
 A tribute to an Indian Educationist - Vinod Raina
 Blog by Vinod Raina in World People's Blog
 'Decentralisation of Education' by Vinod Raina

2013 deaths
20th-century Indian educational theorists
Deaths from cancer in India
Year of birth missing